Luis Gil may refer to:

Luis Gil (baseball) (born 1998), Dominican baseball player
Luis Gil (soccer) (born 1993), American soccer player

See also
Luís Gil Bettencourt (born 1956), Portuguese-American musician